List of high schools in South Africa
List of primary schools in South Africa
List of secondary schools in the Western Cape

 
List
South Africa education-related lists